Maninder Singh Dhir (20 April 1952 – 17 September 2018) was an Indian politician who was a member of Bharatiya Janata and Aam Aadmi political parties.

Dhir was Speaker of the Delhi Legislative Assembly between December 2013 and February 2014. He was elected to the assembly from Jangpura constituency on an Aam Aadmi Party ticket.

In November 2014, he left AAP and joined BJP.

References

1952 births
2018 deaths
Bharatiya Janata Party politicians from Delhi
Delhi MLAs 2013–2015
Speakers of the Delhi Legislative Assembly
Aam Aadmi Party politicians
Deaths from cerebrovascular disease